Fitizh is a rural locality in Selektsionny Selsoviet Rural Settlement, Lgovsky District, Kursk Oblast, Russia. Population:

Geography 

 Climate
Fitizh has a warm-summer humid continental climate (Dfb in the Köppen climate classification).

Transport 
Fitizh is located 4.5 km from the road of regional importance  (Kursk – Lgov – Rylsk – border with Ukraine) as part of the European route E38, on the road of intermunicipal significance  (38K-017 – Fitizh), 6 km from the nearest railway station Artakowo (railway line 322 km – Lgov I).

The rural locality is situated 79 km from Kursk Vostochny Airport, 151 km from Belgorod International Airport and 282 km from Voronezh Peter the Great Airport.

References

Notes

Sources

Rural localities in Lgovsky District